Heshmatieh Rural District is a rural district (dehestan) in Eshaqabad District, Zeberkhan County, Razavi Khorasan Province, Iran.

References 

Rural Districts of Razavi Khorasan Province
Nishapur County